The FC St. Pauli Rugby is the rugby union section of German sports club FC St. Pauli, based in Hamburg. The squad currently plays in the Rugby-Bundesliga, the highest level of the German rugby league system. Other sports practised at St. Pauli are American football, association football, and baseball.

While the men's team has had limited success over the years, St. Pauli's women are one of the most successful teams in Germany, having reached every championship final from 1995 to 2008 and winning eight out of the fourteen.

History

St Pauli 's rugby department was formed in 1933 when two Jewish brothers, Otto and Paul Lang from Heidelberg, were forced to leave their club, the SV St. Georg, and joined FC St Pauli. In April 1933, the FC St Pauli board called for the formation of a rugby team and the club's 6th football XI decided to switch codes and play rugby instead.

It took the team over a year to achieve their first draw but it soon improved and won its first Nordmark championship, against bitter rival Hamburger SV Rugby. It repeated this success in 1938 and 1939.

The club resumed playing rugby in 1947, at first against teams of the British occupation force in Germany, but soon in the Nordmark championship again, which it won uninterruptedly from 1948 to 1958.

In the early 1960s, St Pauli faced strong opposition from local rival SV Polizei Hamburg and the Nordmark championship became a Hamburg-only competition after the last of the teams from Kiel was dissolved.

The club's men's team reached its only German championship final in 1964, when it lost 0-11 to DSV 78 Hannover after having beaten favourites SC Neuenheim in Heidelberg in the semi-finals.

FC St Pauli Rugby was one of the founding members of the new Rugby-Bundesliga in 1971 and, in the first three seasons, was a competitive side there. An ageing team and a slacking in the youth development led to the club's relegation in 1975, temporarily even setting a negative Bundesliga record with a 3-102 defeat against TSV Victoria Linden.

Upon return to the Hamburg championship, the club faced strong competition from Hamburger SV, Hamburger RC and Hamburg Exiles RFC, but was able to win the local championship another eight times between 1976 and 1988. In this era, the club suffered from financial difficulties, brought upon by the professional football team.

The year 1988 brought two important changes to the club. The men's team finally returned to the Rugby-Bundesliga, and a women's team was formed.

The team managed to survive for only two seasons in the Bundesliga and earned another record defeat against Victoria Linden, this time a 0-113.

Instead, the club's women's team begun to shine from 1995 onwards, earning its first German championship that year.

While the women's team continued its success throughout the years, winning eight German championships until 2008, the men's side was able to establish itself on the second level of German rugby, the 2nd Rugby-Bundesliga, where it plays as a mid-table side.

In the season 2011/12 the 1st men's team won the title of the 2nd Rugby-Bundesliga North/East. On the first of May 2012 they competed in a final against the winner of the second tier league in the south Frankfurt 1880 II. The game was played in Hamburg and St. Pauli lost 22:32. The title in the north earned St. Pauli the right for a promotion to the highest level of rugby played in Germany the Rugby-Bundesliga. St. Pauli finished second in their group in the 2012-13 season and qualified for the north/east division of the championship round, where it came fourth. The club was knocked out in the first round of the play-offs after losing 30–13 to SC 1880 Frankfurt.

In 2013–14 the team qualified for the championship round and the play-offs once more, losing to SC Neuenheim in the first round. In the 2014–15 season the club finished sixth in the north-east championship group but was knocked out of the first round of the play-offs after a 78–0 loss to RG Heidelberg.

Club honours

Men
 German rugby union championship
 Runners up: 1964
 German rugby union junior cup
 Champions: 1992, 2002
 Runners up: 1993, 1994
 Nordmark/Hamburg championship
 Champions: 1937, 1938, 1939, 1948–58, 1961, 1963, 1964, 1967–71
 2nd Rugby-Bundesliga
 Division champions: 2002, 2012
 Division runners up: 2005, 2011

Women
 German rugby union championship
 Champions: 1995, 2000, 2001, 2003, 2005, 2006, 2007, 2008
 Runners up: 1996, 1997, 1998, 1999, 2002, 2004, 2012
 German sevens championship
 Champions: 2000, 2001, 2002
 Runners up: 2007

Recent seasons
Recent seasons of the club:

Men

 Until 2001, when the single-division Bundesliga was established, the season was divided in autumn and spring, a Vorrunde and Endrunde, whereby the top teams of the Rugby-Bundesliga would play out the championship while the bottom teams together with the autumn 2nd Bundesliga champion would play for Bundesliga qualification. The remainder of the 2nd Bundesliga teams would play a spring round to determine the relegated clubs. Where two placing's are shown, the first is autumn, the second spring. In 2012 the Bundesliga was expanded from ten to 24 teams and the 2nd Bundesliga from 20 to 24  with the leagues divided into four regional divisions.

Women

Rugby internationals
In Germany's 2006–08 European Nations Cup campaign, FC St Pauli's captain Friedrich Michau was called up for the national team.

Horst Wohler, with 30 internationals, is the club's most capped player.

References

External links
  Official website
  Official website of the rugby department
  FC St. Pauli Rugby club info at totalrugby.de

German rugby union clubs
Rugby clubs established in 1933
Rugby union in Hamburg
Rugby
1933 establishments in Germany